Joaquín Cruz Pérez or Joaquín Pérez y Cruz (1860–1939) was an early Guam judge and acting-Governor of Guam from February 1 to April 20, 1899. He was first appointed as Justice of the Peace in 1894 by the Spanish government of Guam. After the capture of Guam by the United States during the Spanish–American War, he retained his role as a judge, sometimes unofficially. (In 1910, the United States Navy took control of the Guam courts system over an issue of intermarriage.) In 1915, the United States restored the local judiciary and Cruz Pérez was appointed as an Associate Justice in an earlier Supreme Court of Guam, not related to the present Supreme Court.

References 

 http://ns.gov.gu/genealogy/1897index-p.htm 
 https://web.archive.org/web/20061128183958/http://www.justice.gov.gu/SuperiorHistory/hist_05.html

1860 births
1939 deaths
Governors of Guam
Guamanian judges
Guamanian people of Spanish descent